Nate the Great is a series of 30 children's detective stories written by Marjorie Weinman Sharmat featuring the eponymous boy detective, Nate the Great. Sharmat and illustrator Marc Simont inaugurated the series in 1972 with Nate the Great, a 60-page book published by Coward, McCann & Geoghegan.
 Simont illustrated the first twenty books, to 1998, and the last ten were illustrated by Martha Weston, Jody Wheeler, or Olga and Aleksey Ivanov "in the style of Marc Simont." Some of the titles were jointly written with Sharmat's sister Rosalind Weinman, husband Mitchell Sharmat or sons Craig Sharmat and Andrew Sharmat. Regarding the series Marjorie Sharmat calls husband Mitchell "always my first editor, and it's been a very happy collaboration".

Nate the Great Goes Undercover was adapted as a television program and won the Los Angeles International Children's Film Festival Award. The New York Public Library named Nate the Great Saves the King of Sweden (1997, number 19) one of its "100 Titles for Reading and Sharing".

Marjorie Weinman Sharmat's husband, Mitchell Sharmat, passed away in 2011 and her sister, Rosalind Weinman, in 2006. With Marjorie Weinman Sharmat's  passing in 2019 Andrew Sharmat has continued writing the series with Nate the Great and the Earth Day Robot (2021).

Characters
Nate is a detective, a child version of Sam Spade who wears a 'Sherlock Holmes-style deerstalker hat' (the idea of illustrator Marc Simont) and loves pancakes. He solves crimes with his dog, Sludge, introduced in the second case, Nate the Great goes Undercover (1974).

The character Nate was "inspired" by Nathan Weinman, father of Marjorie Sharmat, who had previously "featured" her mother and sister in a novel. She "named the other characters in the [first] book after" other relatives: Annie, Rosamond, and Harry after mother Anne, sister Rosalind, and uncle Harry.

There are several recurring characters beside Nate and his dog Sludge.
 Annie, owner of the fierce dog Fang. She is an African-American girl and one of Nate’s closest friends.
 Oliver, described as a pest
 Rosamond, strange owner of four cats (Super Hex, Big Hex, Plain Hex, and Little Hex.) It is revealed later on in the series that she has a crush on Nate.
 Esmeralda, described as wise
 Finley and Pip, occasional adversaries
 Claude, described as a friend who is "always losing things" 
 
The 2002 volume (number 22) Nate the Great, San Francisco Detective  establishes that Nate the Great and the girl detective Olivia Sharp are cousins. She is the heroine of a 1989–1991 series of four books sometimes called Olivia Sharp, Agent for Secrets, written by Marjorie and Mitchell Sharmat and illustrated by Denise Brunkus.

Rosamond and Emily the Strange origin controversy

The third book in the series Nate the Great Goes Undercover (1978) features a girl named Rosamond. She has long black hair and a short black dress, white mary jane shoes, four black cats of different sizes, and she is frequently described as "strange". 

Emily the Strange is an illustrated fictional character featured in several comic books, graphic novels and in various merchandise and clothing lines. Emily has been considered by some to be a "rip off" of Rosamond. In her first illustration from 1991 Emily has a similar pose, long black hair, and is accompanied by her four black cats.

Rosamond's illustration in Nate the Great Goes Undercover is accompanied by the text, "Rosamond did not look hungry or sleepy. She looked like she always looks. Strange." The first Emily the Strange design says: "Emily did not look tired or happy. She looked like she always looks. Strange."

When Rosamond's creators, Marjorie Sharmat and Marc Simont, allegedly began contacting companies who had contracts related to Emily the Strange and urged them to drop their relationships with Cosmic Debris, Cosmic Debris sued Sharmat and Simont. Sharmat and Simont counter-sued. "Emily the Strange, like Rosamond, is a young girl in a short dress, black tights, and Mary Jane shoes. Emily, like Rosamond, has long dark hair with square-cut bangs. Emily, like Rosamond, is typically attended by four black cats. Emily, like Rosamond, is described as being strange and has a fascination with dark themes," alleged the complaint.

Cosmic Debris contended that Emily and Rosamond both drew from a tradition of similar characters including Vampira and Wednesday Addams, and argued that while the text of the initial Emily illustration was nearly identical with Sharmat's text, that illustration had been withdrawn in 1998 and the statute of limitations had therefore run out.

On August 12, 2009, creator of Emily the Strange and the creators of Nate the Great jointly announced an agreement resolving all disputes between them. Each side agreed to give up all claims against the other as part of their settlement. "We recognize that Emily and Rosamond are both unique and original characters, and we are pleased that we were able to resolve this dispute," said Marjorie Sharmat and Marc Simont.  "We wish Rob, Cosmic Debris, Emily and her fans all the very best."

Series 
The first twenty volumes were illustrated by Marc Simont.

The latest ten volumes were chapter books with illustrations "in the style of Marc Simont".
 Nate the Great and the Monster Mess (1999), illustrated by Martha Weston†
 Nate the Great, San Francisco Detective (1999), with husband Mitchell Sharmat, illus. Weston†
 Nate the Great and the Big Sniff (2001), with Mitchell Sharmat, illus. Weston†
 Nate the Great on the Owl Express (2003), with Mitchell Sharmat, illus. Weston†
 Nate the Great Talks Turkey (2007), with Mitchell Sharmat, illus. Jody Wheeler‡
 Nate the Great and the Hungry Book Club (2009), with Mitchell Sharmat, illus. Wheeler‡
 Nate the Great, Where Are You? (2015), with Mitchell Sharmat, illus. Wheeler‡
 Nate the Great and the Missing Birthday Snake (2018), with son Andrew Sharmat, illus. Wheeler‡
 Nate the Great and the Wandering Word (2019), with son Andrew Sharmat, illus. Wheeler‡
 Nate the Great and the Earth Day Robot (2021), illus. ᚬillustrated by Olga and Aleksey Ivanov Note: First Nate the Great book written after Marjorie Weinman Sharmat passed away in 2019. Written by son Andrew Sharmat.  

† "illustrations by Martha Weston in the style of Marc Simont"
‡ "illustrations by Jody Wheeler in the style of Marc Simont"
ᚬ "illustrated by Olga and Aleksey Ivanov in the style of Marc Simont"

Olivia Sharp 

Olivia Sharp is a girl detective and Nate's cousin. Her four stories were written by the husband-and-wife team Mitchell and Marjorie Sharmat, illustrated by Denise Brunkus, and published by Delacorte Press. The titles are sometimes styled Olivia Sharp: The Pizza Monster, and so on.

 The Pizza Monster (1989)
 The Princess of the Fillmore Street School (1989)
 The Sly Spy (1990)
 The Green Toenails Gang (1991)

In 2008 and 2009 Ravensburger Buchverlag published German-language editions of the first three Olivia Sharp books with new illustrations by Franziska Harvey. All three titles begin with the name of the German heroine, "Bella Bond", and the 2011 omnibus edition of three stories is Bella Bond – Agentin für Geheimnisse; literally "Agent for Secrets".

Adaptations  

 Nate the Great Goes Undercover was adapted as a television program and won the Los Angeles International Children's Film Festival Award.
In 2006, PBS and Animagic were developing a 40-episode animated series based on Nate the Great. 6 weeks into production the series was cancelled as an investor pulling out resulted in the animation studio laying off its entire staff.
A Nate the Great musical by TheatreworksUSA ran in the 2007–2008 and 2008–2009 seasons.

Popular culture 

Nate the Great is mentioned in a few episodes of Between the Lions.
Nate the Great goes Undercover and the whole series is featured in the Reading Rainbow season 2 episode, "Mystery on the Docks", in the Book Reviews ("But you don't have to take my word for it") segment at the end. 
 Nate the Great was featured on 28 million Cheerios boxes to promote children's literacy.

See also

Notes

References

External links
 Nate the Great at publisher Random House
 Nate the Greatat KidsRead 

Book series introduced in 1972
Series of children's books
Detective fiction
Books illustrated by Marc Simont
Child characters in literature
Fictional amateur detectives
Children's mystery novels